Lieutenant-General Frances Jennifer Allen,  is a senior officer serving in the Royal Canadian Air Force. On June 28, 2021, she assumed office as Vice Chief of the Defence Staff, becoming the first woman to hold the position.

Military career
Allen's prior roles included serving as the Canadian military's director general for cyberspace, the National Defence Headquarters director general for information management operations, the joint force cyber component commander, and deputy Vice Chief of the Defence Staff.

In July 2020, Allen was appointed as Canada's military representative at NATO headquarters in Brussels. Allen was considered a contender to become Chief of the Defence Staff after the departure of General Jonathan Vance in January 2021, but that position was given to Admiral Art McDonald.

On March 9, 2021, it was announced that Allen would succeed Lieutenant-General Michael Rouleau as Vice Chief of the Defence Staff, making her the first woman to serve in that role. Allen's appointment to the vice chief position came amidst increased public and political scrutiny of the senior leadership of the Canadian Armed Forces because of sexual misconduct investigations into the two previous chiefs of the Defence Staff (Vance and McDonald).

Allen was appointed an Officer of the Order of Military Merit on 6 March 2017, and advanced to a Commander of the Order of Military Merit on 27 May 2019.

Notelist

References

External links
 Frances J. Allen – Order of Military Merit page

Living people
Royal Canadian Air Force generals
Canadian female military personnel
Year of birth missing (living people)
Commanders of the Order of Military Merit (Canada)
Vice Chiefs of the Defence Staff (Canada)